Hindumalkote railway station is located in Shri Ganganagar district of Rajasthan in India. It situates near the India–Pakistan Border and serves Hindumalkote.

See also
 List of railway stations in India
 Indian Railways

References

External links
Hindumalkote railway station

Railway stations in Sri Ganganagar district
Ambala railway division